Threapland is a hamlet in the Allerdale district, in the county of Cumbria, England. Nearby settlements include the village of Bothel and the village of Plumbland.

See also

Listed buildings in Bothel and Threapland

Hamlets in Cumbria
Allerdale